Hersiliola versicolor is a species of spiders of the family Hersiliidae that lives in Cape Verde. It was first described by John Blackwall in 1865 as Hersilia versicolor. The females have a total length of 3.75-4.58 mm.

References

Further reading
Blackwall (1865) Descriptions of recently discovered spiders collected in the Cape de Verde Islands by John Gray, Esq. Annals and Magazine of Natural History, ser. 3, vol. 16, p. 80-101

Theridiidae
Spiders of Africa
Spiders described in 1865
Taxa named by John Blackwall
Arthropods of Cape Verde
Endemic fauna of Cape Verde